The Hatepe eruption, named for the Hatepe Plinian pumice tephra layer, sometimes referred to as the Taupō eruption or Horomatangi Reef Unit Y eruption, is dated to 232 CE ± 10 and was Taupō Volcano's most recent major eruption. It is thought to be New Zealand's largest eruption within the last 20,000 years. This makes it one of the largest eruptions in the last 5,000 years, comparable to the Minoan eruption in the 2nd millennium BCE, the 946 eruption of Paektu Mountain, the 1257 eruption of Mount Samalas, and the 1815 eruption of Mount Tambora.

Stages of the eruption 

The eruption went through several stages, with six distinct marker horizons identified. Despite the uniform composition of the erupted magma, a wide variety of eruptive styles were displayed, including weak phreatomagmatism, Plinian eruptions, and a huge pyroclastic flow. Rhyolitic lava domes were extruded some years or decades later, forming the Horomatangi Reefs and Waitahanui Bank. 
Most of the stages only affected the immediate surrounds of the caldera and regions to its east due to prevailing wind patterns.
There is evidence that it occurred on an autumn afternoon and its energy release was about 150 megatons of TNT equivalent. The eruption column penetrated to the stratosphere as revealed by deposits in ice core samples in Greenland and Antarctica. As New Zealand was not settled by the Māori until more than 1,000 years later, the area had no known human inhabitants when the eruption occurred. Tsunami deposits of the same age have been found on the central New Zealand coast, evidence that the eruption caused local tsunamis, but much more widespread waves may have been generated (like those observed after the 1883 Krakatoa eruption). The stages as reclassified from 2003 are:

After

It is estimated that it might have taken as much as 30 years to refill the emptied lake in the caldera. There were massive changes in the landscape for  around with all life sterilised and prior landforms evened out, with beyond the ignimbrite sheet likely forest fires and ash associated die back especially to the west. This broke through in a massive flood with peak flow believed to be 17,000 m3/s, over 100 times the current river maximum flood flow.

In due course the Hatepe eruption further expanded the lake that had formed after the much larger Oruanui eruption around 26,500 years ago. The previous outlet was blocked, raising the lake 35 meters above its present level until it broke out after about 20 years in a huge flood.  Over  of water escaped down river in less than 4 weeks with peak discharge of the order of 30,000 m3/s so flowing for more than a week at roughly 200 times the Waikato River's current rate.

Following the eruption rhyolitic lava domes were extruded, these smaller eruptions of unknown total size also created large pumice rafts that were later discovered deposited on the lake shoreline. The volcano continues to be classified as active with periods of volcanic unrest.

Dating the eruption 

Early radiocarbon dating effort on 22 selected carbonized samples yielded an uncalibrated average date of 1,819 ± 17 years BP (131 CE ± 17). Research by Colin J. N. Wilson and others remarked that ongoing calibration pushes the radiocarbon result to a more recent date, and they proposed 186 CE as the exact year of eruption based on ancient Chinese and Roman records of unusual atmospheric phenomena in about this year.

In an effort led by R.S.J. Sparks and others to investigate interhemispheric calibration offset in 1995, the team analyzed the uncalibrated ages of tree rings of a single tree killed in Taupo eruption, cross-matched the uncalibrated tree ring chronology to Northern Hemisphere calibration curve, and extrapolated the calibrated tree ring dates to obtain the outermost ring date of 232 CE ± 15, i.e. the last moment the tree was alive.

In 2012, to circumvent interhemispheric calibration offset, the uncalibrated dates of tree rings of a single tree killed in Taupo eruption were wiggle-matched to New Zealand-derived calibration data set to obtain the currently most precise eruption date of 232 CE ± 8 (95.4% confidence). This date is statistically indistinguishable from that of 1995 study and is the currently accepted date.

However, presence of magmatic carbon in pre-eruption groundwaters has been proposed to contaminate radiocarbon ages by skewing towards older dates possibly up to centuries, suggesting that the date for the Hatepe eruption could be younger than 232 CE ± 8 CE.  

Several volcanic markers in ice cores have been hypothesized to be connected to Taupo eruption, but previously none of the markers could be definitively attributed to Taupo eruption because at the time of these studies no erupted product from this eruption was reported for the various ice cores.

In IAVCEI Scientific Assembly 2023, it is announced that rhyolitic shards derived from Taupo eruption has been identified in Roosevelt Island ice core. These Taupo glass shards deposited in a core interval dated to 230 CE ± 32 based on annual ice layer counting, gas and tephra synchronization. The breakthrough firmly establishes the accuracy of previous wiggle-matching derived eruption date and confirms the eruption date to circa 230 CE.

Post-eruption soil deficiencies
The tephra soils associated with the eruption were deficient in several essential minerals, with cobalt deficiency being the cause of bush sickness in animals that precluded productive livestock farming until this issue was identified and addressed. This identification by New Zealand government scientists in 1934 was probably the most significant single advance in New Zealand agriculture ever, but was not able to be fully exploited until the 1950s with the deployment of cobalt ion containing superphosphate fertiliser from aircraft.

See also 
 North Island Volcanic Plateau

References

External links
Lake-floor relief map, from  Summary: the main Hatepe eruption vents are marked by submarine peaks on the far eastern side of Lake Taupō called the Horomatangi Reefs.

Taupō Volcanic Zone
Volcanic eruptions in New Zealand
3rd-century natural disasters
Ancient natural disasters
Prehistoric volcanic events
Events that forced the climate
VEI-7 eruptions
Phreatomagmatic eruptions
Plinian eruptions
Lake Taupō